Caleb Harrison (September 20, 1879June 8, 1938) was an American politician and vice presidential candidate in the 1916 United States presidential election as Arthur E. Reimer's running mate. He and Reimer were members of the Socialist Labor Party of America. Harrison was born in Reading, Berks, Pennsylvania to William Henry Harrison and Sarah Jane Focht.

Harrison gave lectures about his opposition to militarism and the high cost of living in Moline, Illinois. He later joined the Communist Party of America. He died at the age of 58 on June 8, 1938, in Chicago, Illinois.

References

1879 births
1938 deaths
Socialist Labor Party of America politicians from Illinois
Socialist Labor Party of America vice presidential nominees
1916 United States vice-presidential candidates
Communist Party USA politicians